Mir (also transliterated as Me'īr and Meer) S. Baṣrī (1911-2006) was an Iraqi Jewish writer, economist, journalist, and poet. Among many public positions he held, Basri served as the head and central leader of Baghdad's Jewish community.

Life 
Basri was born on 19 September 1911 in Baghdad, Iraq to Shaool Basri and Farha Dangoor (the daughter of the Chief Rabbi of Baghdad, Ezra Reuben Dangoor). Basri was educated Baghdad at al-Ta'awun and the Alliance school where he studied Hebrew, English, and French. Following his secondary education, he trained as an economist and studied Arabic literature. In 1928, Basri joined the Iraqi Foreign Ministry, going on to hold a number of government positions including many relating to Iraq's Jewish community.

In early January 1969, Basri, then-Chairman of the Jewish Council of Iraq, was detained for almost two months for interviewing an American who the Iraqi government alleged to be a spy. His detention has been characterized as motivated by antisemitic efforts to censor the Iraqi Jewish community. In the early 1970s Basri, who had originally been unwilling to immigrate from his home country, left Iraq for Amsterdam. From Amsterdam, he immigrated to the UK where he lived until his death in 2006.

Writing 
During his career, Basri wrote in a variety of genres, including poetry, biography, periodical, and essay and memoir.  Much of his writing is centered on his identity as a Jew living in the Arab world during the establishment of Israel; themes of patriotism, homeland, Zionism, and religion are common.

Basri described himself as being enthralled with Arabic, particularly Arabic poetry, and published much of his work in the language.

References 

 Mir Basri, by Shmuel Moreh, Encyclopedia of Jews in the Islamic World, 2010, p 3 - 5

See also 
 Anwar Shaul

1911 births
2006 deaths
Jewish Iraqi writers
Iraqi biographers
20th-century Iraqi poets
Jewish poets
Translators to Hebrew
Hebrew-language writers
20th-century Iraqi writers
Iraqi memoirists
Writers from Baghdad
Iraqi economists
Iraqi emigrants to the United Kingdom
Iraqi emigrants to the Netherlands
20th-century Iraqi historians
Iraqi economics writers
20th-century memoirists
20th-century translators